Chaudhry Rana Shamshad Ahmad Khan (Urdu/; 5 May 1965 – 31 May 2015) was a Pakistani politician who was elected as a member of the Provincial Assembly of the Punjab four times. He served as an MPA from 1992 to 1993, 1997 to 1999, 2002 to 2007 and again from 2013 until his assassination in 2015.

Early life and education
Rana Shamshad Ahmad Khan was born on 5 May 1965 in Kamoke, Pakistan. His father, Chaudhry Abdul Wakeel Khan was also a two-time MPA from the Punjab. Shamshad graduated with a Bachelor of Arts in 1987 and was an agriculturist by profession. He was married and had three children.

Political career
During the 1990s, Shamshad served as an MPA in the Punjab from 1992 to 1993 and from 1997 to 1999. He was also the chairman of the Municipal Committee in Kamoke from 1992 to 1993, and nazim (mayor) of Kamoke Tehsil from 2001 to 2002. 

He first became an MPA in 1992 from constituency PP-83 (Gujranwala-VII). His father had previously been elected from this constituency in the 1988 and 1990 general elections, for two consecutive terms. In the 1993 general election, Shamshad contested as a Pakistan Muslim League (N) (PML-N) candidate from PP-83. He received 23,030 votes and lost to Syed Muhammad Khalil-ur-Rehman Chishti, a PML-J candidate.

In the 1997 general election, Shamshad again contested as a PML-N candidate and was elected as an MPA from PP-83. He received 29,254 votes and defeated an independent candidate, Amanat Ali Virk.

In the 2002 general election, he was elected as an MPA from constituency PP-100 (Gujranwala-X) as a Pakistan Muslim League (Q) (PML-Q) candidate, when the PML-Q formed a government in the Punjab. He received 30,711 votes and defeated Haji Muhammad Aslam, a PPPP candidate. Shamshad was appointed as the provincial minister for transport from January 2003 to November 2006. In December 2006, he was appointed as the provincial minister for excise and taxation and held the post until 2007. 

In the 2008 general election, he contested as a PML-Q candidate from PP-100. He received 21,638 votes and lost to Zulfiqar Bhindar, a PPP candidate.

In the 2013 general election, he joined the PML-N and was elected as an MPA for a fourth term, from PP-100. He received 54,118 votes and defeated Yasir Arafat Ramay, a PTI candidate. He remained in the seat until his death.

Assassination
Shamshad was assassinated on 31 May 2015 in Kamoke along with his son, Rana Shahbaz, and an acquaintance of his, Mehmood Shakir. They were shot dead when armed assailants aboard a black vehicle opened fire on Shamshad's car while he was traveling home in the evening. The attackers fled the scene after the attack. The incident was condemned by prime minister Nawaz Sharif, who demanded an inquiry into the attack. Initial reports suggested that the alleged killers may have had a dispute over agricultural land with the victim. In June 2015, his attackers were reportedly arrested by police. In May 2016, another one of his alleged murderers was said to have been killed during a police encounter. In December 2018, one of the accused attackers was reported to have died while in jail.

After Shamshad's death, his brother Chaudhry Akhtar Ali Khan won the by-election in constituency PP-100 and occupied the vacant seat.

References

1965 births
2015 deaths
Assassinated Pakistani politicians
Deaths by firearm in Pakistan
Pakistan Muslim League (N) MPAs (Punjab)
Pakistan Muslim League (Q) MPAs (Punjab)
People from Gujranwala District
Politicians from Punjab, Pakistan
Punjab MPAs 1990–1993
Punjab MPAs 1997–1999
Punjab MPAs 2002–2007
Punjab MPAs 2013–2018